Jay Lynn Johnson (born June 5, 1946) is a retired United States Navy admiral who served as the 26th Chief of Naval Operations from 1996 to 2000. He was later president and chief executive officer of General Dynamics.

Early life
Johnson was born in Great Falls, Montana, on June 5, 1946, and raised in West Salem, Wisconsin. An Eagle Scout and later recipient of the Distinguished Eagle Scout Award, he graduated in 1968 from the United States Naval Academy. His Naval Academy classmates included Admirals Michael Mullen and Dennis C. Blair, Generals Charles Bolden and Michael Hagee; as well as Lt. Col Oliver North and Senator Jim Webb. Upon completion of flight training, Johnson was designated a Naval Aviator in 1969.

Naval career
Johnson's first sea-duty tour was aboard the carrier , where he made two combat cruises flying the F-8J Crusader with Fighter Squadron 191 (VF-191). Subsequent squadron and sea duty tours after transitioning to the F-14 Tomcat included: VF-142, VF-101, commanding officer of VF-84 (1955–1995); commander, Carrier Air Wing One and assistant chief of staff for operations for commander, United States Sixth Fleet.

Shore duty assignments included: aviation junior officer detailer and head, Aviation Officer Junior Assignment Branch at the Bureau of Naval Personnel in Washington, D.C.; student, Armed Forces Staff College, in Norfolk, Virginia; and the Chief of Naval Operations Strategic Studies Group at The Pentagon.

Johnson's first flag officer assignment was as assistant chief of naval personnel for distribution in the Bureau of Naval Personnel. In October 1992, he reported as commander, Carrier Group 8/Commander,  Battle Group. In July 1994, he was assigned as commander, Second Fleet/Commander, Striking Fleet Atlantic/Commander, Joint Task Force 120.

In March 1996, he reported for duty as the 28th Vice Chief of Naval Operations in Washington, D.C.

In August 1996, Johnson became the 26th Chief of Naval Operations following the death of Admiral Jeremy M. Boorda, and served until July 21, 2000.

Awards and decorations

 Distinguished Eagle Scout Award

Later career
Johnson was executive vice president of Dominion Resources, Inc., from December 2002 to September 2008, also serving as senior vice president of Dominion Energy, Inc., from 2000 to 2002; president and chief executive officer of Dominion Delivery from 2002 to 2007; and chief executive officer of Dominion Virginia Power from October 2007 to September 2008.

Johnson has been a director of General Dynamics, one of the largest U.S. defense contractors, since 2003. He served as vice chairman from September 2008 to July 2009, and president and Chief Executive Officer from then until January 2013, when he was succeeded by Phebe Novakovic.

References

External links

1946 births
Living people
United States Naval Aviators
People from Great Falls, Montana
Aviators from Montana
Military personnel from Montana
United States Naval Academy alumni
United States Navy admirals
Chiefs of Naval Operations
Recipients of the Defense Distinguished Service Medal
Recipients of the Legion of Merit
Recipients of the Gallantry Cross (Vietnam)
Vice Chiefs of Naval Operations
People from West Salem, Wisconsin
Recipients of the Navy Distinguished Service Medal
Military personnel from Wisconsin